ABC Music: The Radio 1 Sessions, released in October 2002, is a compilation by post-rock band Stereolab of BBC Radio 1 sessions recorded from July 1991 to August 2001. It includes appearances in John Peel and Mark Radcliffe's shows and it is a CD-only release.

Track listing

CD 1
 "Super-Electric" – 4:48 (Peel, 30/7/1991)
 "Changer" – 4:11
 "Doubt" – 2:41
 "Difficult Fourth Title" – 4:45
 "Laissez Faire" – 3:57 (Peel, 28/6/1992)
 "Revox" – 3:12
 "Peng 33" – 2:57
 "John Cage Bubblegum" – 2:56
 "Wow and Flutter" – 2:54 (Peel, 28/9/1993)
 "Anemie" – 4:41
 "Moogie Wonderland" – 2:34
 "Heavy Denim" – 3:09
 "French Disko" – 3:12 (Radcliffe, 13/12/1993)
 "Wow and Flutter" – 2:56
 "Golden Ball" – 5:45
 "Lo Boob Oscillator" – 4:33
 "Check and Double Check" – 2:51 (Radcliffe, 22/11/1994)
 "Working Title (The Pram Song)" – 4:13

"Difficult Fourth Title" is the song eventually named "Contact" (from Switched On). "Working Title (The Pram Song)" is an early version of "Seeperbold" from Aluminum Tunes.

CD 2
 "International Colouring Contest" – 3:42
 "Anamorphose" – 7:27
 "Metronomic Underground" – 10:14 (Peel, 15/2/1996)
 "Brigitte" – 5:50
 "Spinal Column" – 3:31
 "Tomorrow Is Already Here" – 4:43
 "Les Yper-Sound" – 6:00 (Evening Session, 26/2/1996)
 "Heavenly Van Halen" – 3:09
 "Cybele's Reverie" – 3:59
 "Slow Fast Hazel" – 4:07
 "Nothing to Do With Me" – 4:01 (Peel, 19/9/2001)
 "Double Rocker" – 5:33
 "Baby Lulu" – 5:03
 "Naught More Terrific Than Man" – 3:56

"Heavenly Van Halen" is an early version of "Pinball" from the Fluorescences EP.

References

BBC Radio recordings
2002 live albums
2002 compilation albums
Stereolab compilation albums
Stereolab live albums